Kevan McNicholas is a British Paralympic athlete. In 1984, he won the silver medal in the men's shot put 2 event at the 1984 Summer Paralympics held in Stoke Mandeville, United Kingdom and New York City, United States.

In 1988, he won the silver medal in the men's shot put 2 event at the 1988 Summer Paralympics held in Seoul, South Korea.

References

External links 
 

Living people
Year of birth missing (living people)
Place of birth missing (living people)
Paralympic silver medalists for Great Britain
Paralympic medalists in athletics (track and field)
Athletes (track and field) at the 1984 Summer Paralympics
Athletes (track and field) at the 1988 Summer Paralympics
Medalists at the 1984 Summer Paralympics
Medalists at the 1988 Summer Paralympics
Paralympic athletes of Great Britain
British male shot putters
British male discus throwers
Wheelchair shot putters
Wheelchair discus throwers
Paralympic shot putters
Paralympic discus throwers
20th-century British people
21st-century British people